Licker may refer to:

Roland Licker
Randolph 'Licker' Turpin

Other uses

 African-American Vernacular English pronunciation of “Liquor” or “Liqueur”

See also
 
Lick (disambiguation)
John Lickert
Liquor (disambiguation)